The 1891 Miami Redskins football team was an American football team that represented Miami University during the 1891 college football season. There was no paid head coach for the season. In their second game, they lost 0 to 104 against Ohio Wesleyan.

Schedule

References

Miami
Miami RedHawks football seasons
Miami Redskins football